4th and Brannan station is an at-grade Muni Metro light rail station located in the median of 4th Street at Brannan Street in the South of Market (SoMa) district of San Francisco, California. It opened on November 19, 2022, as part of the Central Subway project.

Service 
The station has a single island platform in the median of 4th Street, with a ramp leading to Brannan Street. Originally, the station was designed with an exclusive train-only lane on the platform's eastern side and a mixed traffic lane on the western side. The station was subsequently redesigned with exclusive lanes on both sides of the platform, enabling trains to proceed faster through the 4th and Bryant intersection preceding the station.

Station design 
A stainless steel kinetic sculpture by Moto Ohtake, entitled Microcosmic, was installed at the station in November 2019 — the first of ten artworks to be installed at Central Subway stations.

References

External links 

SFMTA – 4th St & Brannan St

Future Muni Metro stations
South of Market, San Francisco
Railway stations in the United States opened in 2022